Çayqovuşan or Chayqovushan or Chaykavushan may refer to:

 Çayqovuşan, Ismailli, a village in the Ismailli District of Azerbaijan
 Çayqovuşan, Kalbajar, a village in the Kalbajar District of Azerbaijan